Drewitzer See is a lake in the Mecklenburgische Seenplatte district in Mecklenburg-Vorpommern, Germany. At an elevation of 62.4 m, its surface area is 6.92 km².

External links 
 

Lakes of Mecklenburg-Western Pomerania